Neoregelia uleana is a species of flowering plant in the genus Neoregelia. This species is native to Brazil.

References

uleana
Flora of Brazil